The depth of field (DOF) is the distance between the nearest and the furthest objects that are in acceptably sharp focus in an image captured with a camera.

Factors affecting depth of field

For cameras that can only focus on one object distance at a time, depth of field is the distance between the nearest and the farthest objects that are in acceptably sharp focus. "Acceptably sharp focus" is defined using a property called the "circle of confusion".

The depth of field can be determined by focal length, distance to subject, the acceptable circle of confusion size, and aperture. Limitations of depth of field can sometimes be overcome with various techniques and equipment. The approximate depth of field can be given by:

for a given circle of confusion (c), focal length (f), f-number (N), and distance to subject (u).

As distance or the size of the acceptable circle of confusion increases, the depth of field increases; however, increasing the size of the aperture or increasing the focal length reduces the depth of field. Depth of field changes linearly with F-number and circle of confusion, but changes in proportion to the square of the focal length and the distance to the subject. As a result, photos taken at extremely close range have a proportionally much smaller depth of field.

Sensor size affects DOF in counterintuitive ways. Because the circle of confusion is directly tied to the sensor size, decreasing the size of the sensor while holding focal length and aperture constant will decrease the depth of field (by the crop factor). The resulting image however will have a different field of view. If the focal length is altered to maintain the field of view, the change in focal length will counter the decrease of DOF from the smaller sensor and increase the depth of field (also by the crop factor).

Effect of lens aperture

For a given subject framing and camera position, the DOF is controlled by the lens aperture diameter, which is usually specified as the f-number (the ratio of lens focal length to aperture diameter). Reducing the aperture diameter (increasing the f-number) increases the DOF because only the light travelling at shallower angles passes through the aperture. Because the angles are shallow, the light rays are within the acceptable circle of confusion for a greater distance.

For a given size of the subject's image in the focal plane, the same f-number on any focal length lens will give the same depth of field. This is evident from the DOF equation by noting that the ratio u/f is constant for constant image size. For example, if the focal length is doubled, the subject distance is also doubled to keep the subject image size the same. This observation contrasts with the common notion that "focal length is twice as important to defocus as f/stop", which applies to a constant subject distance, as opposed to constant image size.

Motion pictures make only limited use of aperture control; to produce a consistent image quality from shot to shot, cinematographers usually choose a single aperture setting for interiors and another for exteriors, and adjust exposure through the use of camera filters or light levels. Aperture settings are adjusted more frequently in still photography, where variations in depth of field are used to produce a variety of special effects.

Effect of circle of confusion
Precise focus is only possible at an exact distance from the lens; at that distance, a point object will produce a point image. Otherwise, a point object will produce a blur spot shaped like the aperture, typically and approximately a circle. When this circular spot is sufficiently small, it is visually indistinguishable from a point, and appears to be in focus. The diameter of the largest circle that is indistinguishable from a point is known as the acceptable circle of confusion, or informally, simply as the circle of confusion. Points that produce a blur spot smaller than this acceptable circle of confusion are considered acceptably sharp.

The acceptable circle of confusion depends on how the final image will be used. It is generally accepted to be 0.25 mm for an image viewed from 25 cm away.

For 35 mm motion pictures, the image area on the film is roughly 22 mm by 16 mm. The limit of tolerable error was traditionally set at  diameter, while for 16 mm film, where the size is about half as large, the tolerance is stricter, .

Camera movements

The term "camera movements" refers to swivel (swing and tilt, in modern terminology) and shift adjustments of the lens holder and the film holder. These features have been in use since the 1800s and are still in use today on view cameras, technical cameras, cameras with tilt/shift or perspective control lenses, etc. Swiveling the lens or sensor causes the plane of focus (POF) to swivel, and also causes the field of acceptable focus to swivel with the POF; and depending on the DOF criteria, to also change the shape of the field of acceptable focus. While calculations for DOF of cameras with swivel set to zero have been discussed, formulated, and documented since before the 1940s, documenting calculations for cameras with non-zero swivel seem to have begun in 1990.

More so than in the case of the zero swivel camera, there are various methods to form criteria and set up calculations for DOF when swivel is non-zero. There is a gradual reduction of clarity in objects as they move away from the POF, and at some virtual flat or curved surface the reduced clarity becomes unacceptable. Some photographers do calculations or use tables, some use markings on their equipment, some judge by previewing the image.

When the POF is rotated, the near and far limits of DOF may be thought of as wedge-shaped, with the apex of the wedge nearest the camera; or they may be thought of as parallel to the POF.

Object-field calculation methods
Traditional depth-of-field formulas can be hard to use in practice. As an alternative, the same effective calculation can be done without regard to the focal length and f-number. Moritz von Rohr and later Merklinger observe that the effective absolute aperture diameter can be used for similar formula in certain circumstances.

Moreover, traditional depth-of-field formulas assume equal acceptable circles of confusion for near and far objects. Merklinger suggested that distant objects often need to be much sharper to be clearly recognizable, whereas closer objects, being larger on the film, do not need to be so sharp. The loss of detail in distant objects may be particularly noticeable with extreme enlargements. Achieving this additional sharpness in distant objects usually requires focusing beyond the hyperfocal distance, sometimes almost at infinity. For example, if photographing a cityscape with a traffic bollard in the foreground, this approach, termed the object field method by Merklinger, would recommend focusing very close to infinity, and stopping down to make the bollard sharp enough. With this approach, foreground objects cannot always be made perfectly sharp, but the loss of sharpness in near objects may be acceptable if recognizability of distant objects is paramount.

Other authors such as Ansel Adams have taken the opposite position, maintaining that slight unsharpness in foreground objects is usually more disturbing than slight unsharpness in distant parts of a scene.

Overcoming DOF limitations
Some methods and equipment allow altering the apparent DOF, and some even allow the DOF to be determined after the image is made. For example, focus stacking combines multiple images focused on different planes, resulting in an image with a greater (or less, if so desired) apparent depth of field than any of the individual source images. Similarly, in order to reconstruct the 3-dimensional shape of an object, a depth map can be generated from multiple photographs with different depths of field. Xiong and Shafer concluded, in part, "...the improvements on precisions of focus ranging and defocus ranging can lead to efficient shape recovery methods."

Another approach is focus sweep. The focal plane is swept across the entire relevant range during a single exposure. This creates a blurred image, but with a convolution kernel that is nearly independent of object depth, so that the blur is almost entirely removed after computational deconvolution. This has the added benefit of dramatically reducing motion blur.

Other technologies use a combination of lens design and post-processing: Wavefront coding is a method by which controlled aberrations are added to the optical system so that the focus and depth of field can be improved later in the process.

The lens design can be changed even more: in colour apodization the lens is modified such that each colour channel has a different lens aperture. For example, the red channel may be f/2.4, green may be f/2.4, whilst the blue channel may be f/5.6. Therefore, the blue channel will have a greater depth of field than the other colours. The image processing identifies blurred regions in the red and green channels and in these regions copies the sharper edge data from the blue channel. The result is an image that combines the best features from the different f-numbers.

At the extreme, a plenoptic camera captures 4D light field information about a scene, so the focus and depth of field can be altered after the photo is taken.

Diffraction and DOF
Diffraction causes images to lose sharpness at high F-numbers, and hence limits the potential depth of field. In general photography this is rarely an issue; because large f-numbers typically require long exposure times, motion blur may cause greater loss of sharpness than the loss from diffraction. However, diffraction is a greater issue in close-up photography, and the tradeoff between DOF and overall sharpness can become quite noticeable as photographers are trying to maximise depth of field with very small apertures.

Hansma and Peterson have discussed determining the combined effects of defocus and diffraction using a root-square combination of the individual blur spots. Hansma's approach determines the f-number that will give the maximum possible sharpness; Peterson's approach determines the minimum f-number that will give the desired sharpness in the final image, and yields a maximum depth of field for which the desired sharpness can be achieved. In combination, the two methods can be regarded as giving a maximum and minimum f-number for a given situation, with the photographer free to choose any value within the range, as conditions (e.g., potential motion blur) permit. Gibson gives a similar discussion, additionally considering blurring effects of camera lens aberrations, enlarging lens diffraction and aberrations, the negative emulsion, and the printing paper. Couzin gave a formula essentially the same as Hansma's for optimal f-number, but did not discuss its derivation.

Hopkins, Stokseth, and Williams and Becklund have discussed the combined effects using the modulation transfer function.

DOF scales

Many lenses include scales that indicate the DOF for a given focus distance and f-number; the 35 mm lens in the image is typical. That lens includes distance scales in feet and meters; when a marked distance is set opposite the large white index mark, the focus is set to that distance. The DOF scale below the distance scales includes markings on either side of the index that correspond to f-numbers. When the lens is set to a given f-number, the DOF extends between the distances that align with the f-number markings.

Photographers can use the lens scales to work backwards from the desired depth of field to find the necessary focus distance and aperture. For the 35 mm lens shown, if it were desired for the DOF to extend from 1 m to 2 m, focus would be set so that index mark was centered between the marks for those distances, and the aperture would be set to f/11.

On a view camera, the focus and f-number can be obtained by measuring the depth of field and performing simple calculations. Some view cameras include DOF calculators that indicate focus and f-number without the need for any calculations by the photographer.

Hyperfocal distance

Near:far distribution

The DOF beyond the subject is always greater than the DOF in front of the subject. When the subject is at the hyperfocal distance or beyond, the far DOF is infinite, so the ratio is 1:∞; as the subject distance decreases, near:far DOF ratio increases, approaching unity at high magnification. For large apertures at typical portrait distances, the ratio is still close to 1:1.

DOF formulae
This section covers some additional formula for evaluating depth of field; however they are all subject to significant simplifying assumptions: for example, they assume the paraxial approximation  of Gaussian optics. They are suitable for practical photography, lens designers would use significantly more complex ones.

Focus and f-number from DOF limits

the harmonic mean of the near and far distances. In practice, this is equivalent to the arithmetic mean for shallow depths of field.  Sometimes, view camera users refer to the difference  as the focus spread.

Foreground and background blur

If a subject is at distance  and the foreground or background is at distance , let the distance between the subject and the foreground or background be indicated by

The blur disk diameter  of a detail at distance  from the subject can be expressed as a function of the subject magnification , focal length , f-number , or alternatively the aperture , according to

The minus sign applies to a foreground object, and the plus sign applies to a background object.

The blur increases with the distance from the subject; when  is less than the circle of confusion, the detail is within the depth of field.

See also

Notes

References

Citations

Sources 

 
 
  Available in PDF online.
 
  Available as GIF images on the Large Format page.
 
 
 
 
  Available as GIF images on the Large Format page.
 
 
 
 
 
 
 
 
  Reprinted 2002, Bellingham, WA: SPIE Press, .

Further reading
Hummel, Rob (editor). 2001. American Cinematographer Manual. 8th ed. Hollywood: ASC Press.

External links

Depth of Field in Photography - Beginner's Guide
Online Depth of Field Calculator Simple depth of field and hyperfocal distance calculator
 photoskop: Interactive Photography Lessons – Interactive Depth of Field
 Bokeh simulator and depth of field calculator Interactive depth of field calculator with background blur simulation feature
 Lens Comparison: Nikon 50mm f/1.4D vs. 50mm f/1.4G Demonstration of varying apertures on Depth of Field
Depth Of Field For Beginners- A quick explainer video for DOF

Geometrical optics
Science of photography
Photographic techniques